Bedwell Harbour is a harbor between South Pender Island and North Pender Island in British Columbia, close to the Canada–US border. Bedwell Harbour is an official port of entry for sailors from the United States.

The Bedwell Harbour Water Aerodrome is located in Bedwell Harbour. Northeast of the settlement lies Skull Islet.

GPS location:

See also
Port Browning, British Columbia

References

penderisland.info History
nwcruising.net Bedwell Harbour
www.portbrowning.com
The Resettlement of British Columbia: Essays on Colonialism and Geographical,  By Cole Harris, page 179

Ext. Links
facebook.com Port Browning

Settlements in British Columbia